Jason Perlow is a technology and food blogger, and a Linux expert. He writes the blog "Tech Broiler" for ZDNet, where he is Senior Technology Editor.

Background
Perlow spent ten years as a technology consultant for Bankers Trust, Canon, and Sharp Electronics.

He was a Senior Technical Editor for PalmPower Magazine and Windows CE Power Magazine, a writer for Sm@rtReseller Magazine, and was a Senior Technology Editor for Linux Magazine.

Perlow was an Advisory Architect for IBM Global Technology Services's Server Optimization and Datacenter Relocation practice from September 2007 to December 2012. He now works for Microsoft in their Small to Mid-Market Solutions & Partners division (SMS&P) as a Technical Solution Professional and Partner Technology Advisor focusing on providing solutions for Cloud hosting providers.

Foodie
Perlow founded the eGullet.com food discussion community along with food writer Steven Shaw in August 2001 and was its sole financial supporter, proprietor and technologist. In 2004, he gave up his financial interest in the company and it became the eGullet Society for Culinary Arts and Letters, a 501(c)(3) nonprofit charity, and he joined its Board of Directors.

In February 2006, Perlow founded his personal foodie blog, "Off The Broiler."

In April 2006, Perlow left eGullet and its board of directors to concentrate on Off The Broiler full-time. In 2007, Perlow decided to change his foodie lifestyle, a change which was chronicled by the New York Times.

References

External links
 "Off the Broiler" blog
 "Tech Broiler" blog

Living people
American food writers
American technology writers
American bloggers
21st-century American non-fiction writers
Year of birth missing (living people)
20th-century births